Oliver George Arthur Watkins (born 30 December 1995) is an English professional footballer who plays as a forward for  club Aston Villa and the England national team.

Watkins is a product of the Exeter City academy and made his breakthrough at the club, winning the EFL Young Player of the Year award, before departing in 2017 for Brentford. He had a successful three-year spell at the club, culminating in being the joint top-scorer in the 2019–20 Championship and being named Championship Player of the Year in 2020. He signed for Aston Villa in September 2020.

Early life and education
Oliver George Arthur Watkins was born on 30 December 1995 in Newton Abbot, Devon. He grew up in Newton Abbot and attended South Dartmoor Community College. Watkins is a boyhood Arsenal fan.

Club career

Exeter City
Watkins joined Exeter City's academy at U11 level, having previously failed a trial with the club at the age of 9 in 2003. He rose through the youth ranks to sign a scholarship deal in 2012 and off the back of scoring 30 goals for the U18 team in its 2013–14 Football League Youth Alliance South West Conference-winning season, he signed a two-year professional contract in April 2014. Watkins won his maiden first-team call up when he was named as a substitute for the final League Two match of the 2013–14 season versus Hartlepool United and he made his senior debut when he replaced Aaron Dawson after 77 minutes of the 2–0 victory. Watkins was frequently named as a substitute by Paul Tisdale during the first three months of the 2014–15 season, but despite scoring his first senior goal (a late consolation in a 3–1 Football League Trophy second round defeat to Coventry City on 7 October 2014), he made just three appearances before departing on loan to Weston-super-Mare for the remainder of the campaign in December 2014.

2014–15: Loan to Weston-super-Mare
On 8 December 2014, Watkins and Exeter City teammate Matt Jay joined Conference South club Weston-super-Mare on one-month loan deals. Through repeated extensions of the loan, Watkins would remain with the Seagulls until the end of the 2014–15 season. He featured regularly for the team, scoring 10 goals in 25 appearances before returning to St James Park at the end of the season.

2015–17: Breakthrough
After failing to be named in a first-team squad during the opening two months of the 2015–16 season, Watkins broke onto the substitutes' bench in October 2015 and made his first appearance of the season late in the month. He made his first start for Exeter City in a 2–1 Devon derby victory over Plymouth Argyle on 6 December and scored his first goal of the season with the Grecians' second in a 2–0 FA Cup second round victory over Port Vale in the following match. By March 2016, Watkins had broken into the starting lineup. He had a fantastic month in March, scoring four goals in six appearances to win the Football League Young Player of the Month and PFA Fans' Player of the Month awards. His goalscoring run extended into mid-April and finished with 8 goals in 10 appearances. Two of the goals came in the return Devon derby with Plymouth Argyle, in which his late brace sealed a 2–1 comeback victory and the second goal was subsequently voted as the club's Goal of the Season. Watkins finished the 2015–16 season with 10 goals in 22 appearances.

Watkins' performances in the final two months of the 2015–16 season saw him enter 2016–17 as an established member of the first-team squad. He had an eventful season, making 52 appearances, scoring six goals and contributing 13 assists, though the campaign ended on a sour note with the Grecians' 2–1 defeat to Blackpool in the 2017 League Two play-off final at Wembley Stadium. Watkins scored the first hat-trick of his career in a 4–1 win over Newport County on 31 December 2016 and his two goals and five assists in January 2017 saw him win the League Two Player of the Month award. On 9 April he was award the EFL Young Player of the Year award for his performances during the season.

Brentford
On 18 July 2017, Watkins joined Championship club Brentford on a four-year contract, with an option for a further year, for an undisclosed fee, reported to be £1.8 million. He scored his first competitive goal for the club in their 3–1 EFL Cup first round extra time victory over AFC Wimbledon on 8 August 2017.

On 9 August 2019 Watkins signed a new four-year contract with a one-year extension option. 

Watkins scored his first hat-trick for the club in the Championship against Barnsley in a 3–1 win on 29 September 2019. Watkins made 50 appearances and scored 26 goals in all competitions during the 2019–20 season, which ended with defeat in the 2020 Championship play-off final.

Aston Villa
On 9 September 2020, Watkins joined Premier League team Aston Villa on a five-year contract, for a then club-record £28 million fee, which could rise to £33 million. In joining Aston Villa, Watkins was reunited with manager Dean Smith who had originally signed him for Brentford. On 15 September 2020, Watkins made his Aston Villa debut, scoring in a 3–1 away win in the EFL Cup against Burton Albion. He went on to make his Premier League debut on 21 September 2020, in a 1–0 home win against Sheffield United.

On 4 October 2020, Watkins scored his first Premier League goals, scoring through a left footed strike, a right footed strike and a header for a perfect hat-trick in a 7–2 home victory over champions Liverpool. It was Liverpool's heaviest defeat in 57 years and was the first time in Premier League history that a reigning champion had conceded 7 goals in a single match. On 10 April 2021, Watkins scored against Liverpool again, becoming the first player since Andrey Arshavin in the 2008–09 season to score as many as four goals against Liverpool in a single Premier League season. With 14 goals, he became Aston Villa's top scorer of the 2020–21 season.

International career
On 18 March 2021, Watkins was named in Gareth Southgate's England squad for 2022 FIFA World Cup qualification matches against San Marino, Albania and Poland. On 25 March 2021, Watkins made his England debut as a second-half substitute in a 5–0 victory over San Marino at Wembley. He subsequently scored his first England goal with his first shot on target in an England shirt.

Watkins was named in the provisional England squad for UEFA Euro 2020 in May 2021. However, he was not selected in the final 26-man squad for the tournament.

Watkins made his first start for England on 29 March 2022 at Wembley in a friendly against the Ivory Coast, scoring the opening goal in the 30th minute of the 3–0 win.

Style of play
Watkins has described himself as "a number 10" and named Thierry Henry as his sporting idol, stating in 2017 that "I try to base my game on his, by driving at defenders and looking to make something happen when I get the ball". He is also adept as a winger. He was adapted into a more traditional centre forward during the 2019–20 season at Brentford.

Career statistics

Club

International

England score listed first, score column indicates score after each Watkins goal

Honours
Individual
EFL Championship Player of the Year: 2019–20
PFA Team of the Year: 2019–20 Championship
EFL Young Player of the Year: 2016–17
EFL League Two Player of the Month: 2016–17
Football League Young Player of the Month: March 2016
PFA Fans' Player of the Month: March 2016

References

External links

Profile at the Aston Villa F.C. website
Profile at the Football Association website

1995 births
Living people
People from Newton Abbot
Footballers from Devon
English footballers
Association football forwards
Exeter City F.C. players
Weston-super-Mare A.F.C. players
Brentford F.C. players
Aston Villa F.C. players
English Football League players
National League (English football) players
Premier League players
England international footballers
Black British sportspeople